Ethmia vittalbella is a moth in the family Depressariidae. It is found on Morocco, Tunisia, Algeria, Libya, Egypt, Jordan, Arabia, Armenia, Turkmenistan, Uzbekistan, Kazakhstan, Iran, Iraq, Syria, Afghanistan, Pakistan, India and Russia.

References

Moths described in 1877
vittalbella